Dr. Kathy Townsend is an academic marine biologist at the University of Queensland (UQ), Australia.

Early life 
Kathy Townsend was born in Calgary, Alberta, Canada. She enrolled in the University of Calgary in 1990, before moving to Australia in 1991 to pursue marine biology studies at the University of Queensland. She credits the Jacques Cousteau documentaries as the inspiration for her passion for marine biology.

Career 
Townsend obtained her BSc and PhD, both in marine biology, from UQ. She is best known for her work on manta rays, the ecology of coral reefs, and the impact of ingested marine rubbish on sea turtles, with particular reference to Queensland's marine environments and organisms. She also works with the Earthwatch Institute.

Townsend assisted in the production of, and appeared in, David Attenborough's series Great Barrier Reef.

Awards 

Townsend's awards include:

References

External links 
 

Australian marine biologists
University of Queensland alumni
Academic staff of the University of Queensland
Living people
Year of birth missing (living people)